The Tour Bohemia was a one-day cycling race held annually between 2012 and 2014 in the Czech Republic. It was part of UCI Europe Tour in category 1.2. It was replaced in 2015 by the East Bohemia Tour.

Winners

References

Cycle races in the Czech Republic
Recurring sporting events established in 2012
2012 establishments in the Czech Republic
Recurring sporting events disestablished in 2014
2014 disestablishments in the Czech Republic
UCI Europe Tour races
Defunct cycling races in the Czech Republic